Minolta AF 35mm 1.4 lens is a camera lens that was introduced by Minolta in 1987 (originally as a non-G lens), and revised in 1998 as Minolta AF 35mm 1.4 G New. In 2005, Konica Minolta announced the Konica Minolta AF 35mm 1.4 G (D) with revised optics, mechanics and distance encoder. This version was never released, but saw life as Sony α 35mm 1.4 G (SAL-35F14G) in 2006, released by Sony. The 35mm 1.4 G is compatible with cameras using the Minolta AF and Sony α lens mounts.

See also
 List of Minolta A-mount lenses

Sources
Dyxum lens data

External links
Sony:  SAL-35F14G: 35mm F1.4 G Fixed lens

Products introduced in 1987
35